(born 14 October 1958) is a Japanese film director. He directed the documentary The Ants (2006).

Reception
"In the intricate tapestry of World War II, there are still many threads left to be considered. Hidden in the annals, and almost forgotten, is the full record of Japan’s military actions in China. Director Ikeya Kaoru covers this controversial territory from a deeply human perspective, that of 80-year-old veteran Mr. Okumura, who once fought beside fellow Imperial soldiers in China, and who is now confronting the spectre of his war crimes. In a passionate campaign, Okumura joins with fellow veterans to expose the secret military orders that kept his company in China years after Japan had ostensibly surrendered. His macabre journey takes him from Japan’s Yasukuni shrine, where he pities youth celebrating the monument “in ignorance,” back to China, where he tries to come to terms, face-to-face, with victims of the atrocities. Ants is a sweeping documentary that vividly and articulately relates the present to the past, and the personal to the political. Kaoru's direction and Okumura's project become fused in meaning, and together they weave a crucial historical filament that is binding and also damning." ~Brett Hendrie.

External links 
 

Japanese film directors
1958 births
Living people